George Worthington Adams (November 22, 1905 – November 6, 1981) was the Chairman of Commission on Extension Courses and Director of the University Extension at Harvard University from 1946 to 1949.  He was the third person to hold the position.

Born in Jacksonville, Illinois, he received a bachelor's degree from Illinois College and a master's degree and doctorate at Harvard, where he also served as secretary to the Graduate School of Arts and Sciences.

Adams taught at the MacMurray College for Women, and was a professor of history and dean at Colorado College.  He later went on to become the chairman of the History Department at Southern Illinois University.  He also taught American Studies in Salzburg, Austria.

Published Works

References

Works Cited

External links

1905 births
1981 deaths
People from Jacksonville, Illinois
Illinois College alumni
Harvard University alumni
Harvard Extension School faculty
Harvard University administrators
MacMurray College faculty
Colorado College faculty
20th-century American academics